Farrington's Grove Historic District is a national historic district located at Terre Haute, Vigo County, Indiana. It encompasses 1,110 contributing buildings in a predominantly residential section of Terre Haute.  It developed between about 1850 and 1935, with most built between 1890 and 1920, and includes representative examples of Greek Revival, Italianate, Queen Anne, and Colonial Revival style architecture.  Located in the district are the separately listed Sage-Robinson-Nagel House and Williams-Warren-Zimmerman House.  Other notable buildings include the English-Bogard House (1873), Kelley-Luther-Trent House (1901), Meyer-Gantner House (1923), Grover-Shannon-Lee House (1856), Potter-Steele-Tablr House (1870), Reckert-Robertson House (1890), Hawthorne Building (1871), and Temple Israel (1911).

It was listed on the National Register of Historic Places in 1986.

References

Historic districts on the National Register of Historic Places in Indiana
Greek Revival houses in Indiana
Italianate architecture in Indiana
Queen Anne architecture in Indiana
Colonial Revival architecture in Indiana
Historic districts in Terre Haute, Indiana
National Register of Historic Places in Terre Haute, Indiana